WOWD-LP ("wow-dee") is a Variety formatted broadcast radio station licensed to Takoma Park, Maryland, serving a potential terrestrial audience of 250,000 listeners in Takoma Park, College Park and Hyattsville in Maryland, along with parts of Northeast and Northwest Washington, D.C.  WOWD-LP is owned and operated by Historic Takoma, Inc.

History
After applying for an LPFM license in November 2013, Takoma Radio was awarded the license for 94.3 fm by the FCC in January of 2015. The effort was led by a group of local volunteers, organized by Takoma Park resident and broadcast veteran Marika Partridge. "Good morning, world, this is Takoma Radio," said Partridge, the first words broadcast from the station at 9:43am on July 16, 2016 from a volunteer-built studio in the heart of historic Takoma Park

Programming
Takoma Radio features a variety of music and talk programming and features shows such as Afropop Worldwide, broadcasters such as literary scholar Carolivia Herron and host of NPR's All Songs Considered Bob Boilen, and specials such as vintage jazz expert Rob Bamberger and live performances from local musicians.

See also
List of community radio stations in the United States

References

External links
 Takoma Radio Online
 

OWD-LP
Hyattsville, Maryland
Takoma Park, Maryland
OWD-LP
Variety radio stations in the United States
Radio stations established in 2016
2016 establishments in Maryland
Community radio stations in the United States